Number Ones  is a compilation album by American country music artist Conway Twitty. It was released  n 1982 via MCA Records.

Track listing

Chart performance

References

1982 compilation albums
Conway Twitty albums
Albums produced by Owen Bradley
Albums produced by Ron Chancey
MCA Records compilation albums